Berzerk is a multidirectional shooter designed by Alan McNeil and released for arcades in 1980 by Stern Electronics of Chicago. Following Taito's Stratovox, it is one of the first arcade video games with speech synthesis. Berzerk places the player in a series of top-down, maze-like rooms containing armed robots. Home ports were published for the Atari 2600, Atari 5200, and Vectrex.

A sequel, Frenzy, was released in 1982.

Gameplay

When the game begins, the player controls a green stick man on the left of the screen. In two-player games, the second player controls a purple stick man on the right of the screen. Each player plays until they lose a life, allowing the other player to have a turn. 

Using a joystick and a firing button that activates a laser-style weapon, the player navigates a simple maze filled with many robots, who fire lasers back at the player character. A player can be killed by being shot, by running into a robot or an exploding robot, getting electrocuted by the electrified walls of the maze itself, or by being touched by the player's nemesis, Evil Otto.

The function of Evil Otto, represented by a bouncing smiley face, is to quicken the pace of the game. Otto is unusual, with regard to games of the period, in that he's indestructible. Otto can go through walls with impunity and hunts the player character. If robots remain in the maze Otto moves slowly, about half as fast as the humanoid, but he speeds up to match the humanoid's speed once all the robots are killed. Evil Otto moves at exactly the same speed as the player going left and right but he can move faster than the player going up and down; thus, no matter how close Otto is, the player can escape as long as they can avoid moving straight up or down.

The player advances by escaping from the maze through an opening in the far wall. Each robot destroyed is worth 50 points. If all the robots in the current maze have been destroyed before the player escapes, the player gains ten points per robot. The game has 65,536 rooms (256×256 grid), but due to limitations of the random number generation there are fewer than 1,024 maze layouts (876 of which are unique). It has only one controller, but two-player games can be accomplished by alternating at the joystick.

As a player's score increases, the colors of the enemy robots change, and the robots can have more bullets on the screen at the same time. Once they reach the limit of simultaneous on-screen bullets, they cannot fire again until one or more of their bullets detonates; the limit applies to the robots as a group, not as individuals.

A free life can be awarded at 5,000 or 10,000 points, set by internal DIP switches, with no extra lives thereafter.

The game's voice synthesizer generates speech for the robots during certain in-game events:

 "Coin detected in pocket": During attract mode, specifically while showing the high score list.
 "Intruder alert! Intruder alert!": Spoken when Evil Otto appears.
 "The humanoid must not escape" or "The intruder must not escape": Heard when the player escapes a room after destroying every robot.
 "Chicken, fight like a robot": Heard when the player escapes a room without destroying every robot.
 "Got the humanoid, got the intruder!": Heard when the player loses a life (the "got the intruder" part is a minor third higher than the "got the humanoid" part).

There is random robot chatter playing in the background, with phrases usually consisting of "Charge", "Attack", "Kill", "Destroy", "Shoot", or "Get", followed by "The Humanoid", "The intruder", "it", or "the chicken" (the last only if the player got the "Chicken, fight like a robot" message from the previous room), creating sentences such as "Attack it", "Get the Humanoid", "Destroy the intruder", "Kill the chicken", and so on. The speed and pitch of the phrases vary, from deep and slow, to high and fast; as well as different versions of the game being translated into four different languages such as English, French, German, and Spanish.

Development
Alan McNeil (1951-2017), an employee of Universal Research Laboratories (a division of Stern Electronics), had a dream one night involving a black-and-white video game in which he had to fight robots. It was named for Fred Saberhagen's Berserker series of science fiction novels.

"Evil Otto" was named after Dave Otto, security chief at McNeil's former employer Dave Nutting Associates. According to McNeil, Dave Otto would "[smile] while he chewed you out". He would also lock McNeil and his fellow employees out of the building to enforce a noon-hour lunch, as well as piping beautiful music into every room.

The idea for a black-and-white game was abandoned. At that point Stern decided to use a color overlay board for Berzerk. A quick conversion was made, and all but the earliest versions of the game shipped with a color CRT display. The game was test-marketed successfully at a Chicago singles bar before general release.

Technology
The game was originally planned around a Motorola 6809E processor, but problems with the external clock for this CPU led to its abandonment in favor of a Zilog Z80.

The game suffered from failure of the optical 8-way joystick unit; Stern suffered the cancellation of about 4,200 orders for new games because of previous purchasers' bad experiences with these joysticks. The company responded by issuing free replacement joysticks in a leaf-switch design by Wico.

Berzerk is one of the first video games to use speech synthesis, featuring talking robots.

Ports
Berzerk was officially ported to the Atari 2600, Atari 5200, and Vectrex. The Atari 2600 version has an option allowing Evil Otto to be temporarily killed, though he always returns. The Atari 5200 version is the only home version to include digitized speech.

A port for the Atari 8-bit family of computers, identical to the Atari 5200 version, was ready in 1983, but was not published.

A portable version of Berzerk was planned by Coleco, similar in design to its line of VFD tabletop games including Pac-Man and Frogger, but was never released.

Reception

The game received highly positive reviews and was highly considered to be one of the greatest video games ever made.

Ed Driscoll reviewed Berzerk in The Space Gamer No. 56. Driscoll commented that "if you liked Berzerk, or if you simply enjoy shooting evil robots in electrified mazes, then look for this at your local store. But watch out for Evil Otto!" 
The Atari 2600 version received a Certificate of Merit in the category of "Best Solitaire Video Game" at the 4th annual Arkie Awards. In 2010, IGN

Retrospective
Brett Weiss of AllGame gave the arcade version a review score of 4.5 out of 5 stars calling the Berzerk: "A great game that is immensely challenging and imminently replayable." He also reviewed the Atari 5200 version and gave a review score of 4 out of 5 stars and praised the Atari port writing: "excellent job of recapturing the play mechanics and the voice feature."

Evil Otto was ranked 78th in "Top 100 Videogames Villains" by IGN. In 1995, Flux magazine ranked the game 55th on their "Top 100 Video Games."

Reviews
Games

Legacy
Milton-Bradley produced a Berzerk board game designed for two players, one playing Evil Otto and the robots, the other playing the hero. The playing pieces are plastic yellow rectangular panels that are labeled with the corresponding characters. The hero figure is differently shaped and labeled only on one side. It also has a slot in which a second piece is inserted representing the character's arms, both equipped with laser pistols. Pressing down on the back tab raises the guns and if the figure is properly positioned in the space, it knocks down a robot. Firing the weapon counts as one move.

In 1982, Stern released Frenzy as a sequel. A Berzerk arcade machine can be converted to Frenzy simply by replacing one processor (ZPU-1000 to ZPU-1001) and installing a different ROM.

In 2002, the Atari 2600 version was hacked to include speech.

Berzerk was released for iOS in 2013 as part of the Vectrex Regeneration app.

An unofficial port for the NES was released by Parisoft in July 2019.

Fatality
In 1982 a player died from a heart attack while playing Berzerk, which has been cited as the first recorded case of a death caused by video gaming. However, the incident has been mired in urban legend, with accounts varying as to how many people died (ranging one to three), when the death occurred (while playing Berzerk or after moving on to another cabinet), and whether or not the victim was showing signs of stress before playing the game. The coroner ruled that the heart attack was caused by scarring of heart tissue which the victim would have had before playing the game, and that any form of exertion could have triggered the attack.

Influence
The influence of Berzerk upon popular culture is marked by appearances of the game and samples of its media within television shows, music, and movies. Several third-party clones of the original game exist, and the design of Shamus (1982) is greatly influenced by it.

Eugene Jarvis cited Berzerk as an influence on Robotron: 2084 (1982), the basic concept of which was to combine elements of Berzerk with that of Space Invaders (1978). The 1981 computer game Castle Wolfenstein was also influenced by Berzerk.

See also

 Wizard of Wor
 Gorf

References

External links 
 Berzerk at Killer List of Videogames
 Berzerk at GameFAQs
 Berzerk at Giant Bomb

1980 video games
Arcade video games
Atari 2600 games
Atari 5200 games
Cancelled Atari 8-bit family games
Maze games
Multidirectional shooters
Video games about robots
Stern video games
Vectrex games
Video games developed in the United States
Multiplayer and single-player video games